Montgobert is a commune in the Aisne department in Hauts-de-France in northern France. It is situated 9.7 km from Villers-Cotterêts, 15.3 km from Vic-sur-Aisne, 94 km from Paris, 113 km from Amiens and 180 km from Lille.

Sights
Château de Montgobert

Population

See also
Communes of the Aisne department

References

Communes of Aisne
Aisne communes articles needing translation from French Wikipedia